James Henry Nicholls (27 November 1919 – 2002) was an English footballer who played as a goalkeeper in the Football League for Bradford Park Avenue and Rochdale. In 1957, he played in the National Soccer League with Toronto Ulster United.

References

1919 births
2002 deaths
People from Coseley
English footballers
Association football goalkeepers
Bradford (Park Avenue) A.F.C. players
Rochdale A.F.C. players
English Football League players
Toronto Ulster United players
Canadian National Soccer League players